Wish Come True is a 2010 Philippine television drama romance series broadcast by GMA Network. It serves as the second installment of Love Bug. Starring Daniel Matsunaga and Kris Bernal, it premiered on June 20, 2010. The series concluded on August 22, 2010.

Cast and characters

 Daniel Matsunaga as Raoul del Rosario
 Kris Bernal as Gella
 Rich Asuncion as Isabelle
 Chariz Solomon as Britney

References

2010 Philippine television series debuts
2010 Philippine television series endings
Filipino-language television shows
GMA Network drama series